Burrs Country Park covers a 36 hectare (86 acre) site on the banks of the River Irwell, 1.5 km (1 ml) north west of Bury, Greater Manchester, England. It was acquired by Bury Metropolitan Borough Council in 1986 and transformed from a derelict industrial site into a modern country park.

Description
The park covers an area once housing the mill complex of the Burr and Higher Woodhill cotton mills. The old mill remains were in the main removed from the site with certain features of interest left in situ, these include the Burrs Mill chimney, the mill floor and water wheel pit.  The park also contains the feeder canal for Elton Reservoir, which is the source of water for the Manchester Bolton & Bury Canal.  The site is on the Irwell Sculpture Trail and has three sculptures, 'Waterwheel' by David Kemp, 'Stone Cycle' by Julie Edwards and 'Picnic Area' by David Fryer. The site is also home to the Bury Agricultural Society Show Ground, moved here in 2001 following the loss of the Bury Show Ground. Bury MBC have a limited Countryside Warden service office located in a mill old cottage on Stock Street. It has been awarded  Green Flag accreditation for 2007/08. and a "Much Loved" award as part of Fields in Trust's UK's Best Park competition.

Leisure uses
The site has leisure activities including

 The Irwell Sculpture Trail runs through the park
 The East Lancashire Railway has a Halt in the park
 Outdoor pursuits (walking and orienteering trails)  
 Canoeing (training pool and slalom course).  The long established Bury Canoe Club is based at the Burrs.  
 Playground 
 Industrial archaeology - interpretation boards explain the history of the mills and cottages
 Picnic tables 
 The Lamppost Café
 The Brown Cow public house is also housed in the country park
 Caravanning - The Caravan and motorhome Club has recently opened a purpose built camping and caravan site.
 Fishing by licence only
 Birdwatching - resident herons, dippers and kingfishers
 Cycling (lies on the National Cycle Route 6)
 Nature study (woodland, wetland and open space habitats)
 Friends of Burrs : The Friends of Burrs group is a collection of local residents and park users who are passionate about Burrs Country Park. The group carries out fundraising and practical park improvement projects including a gardening club, balsam bashing and litter picking.

Access
The park lies on several bus routes from Bury town centre. There is a railway station on the East Lancashire Railway nearby to the park which was opened on January 1, 2017  and since January 2017, has seen regular passenger services. The park is easily accessible by car or bicycle from Bury Bridge on the A58 and by footpaths leading from the suburbs of Brandlesholme, to the west, and Walmersley, Seedfield and Limefield to the east.

Information
Bury MBC provide several guides to the area including the Irwell Sculpture Trail, wildlife, fishing and industrial heritage. These are available from Bury MBC at the site or can be downloaded at the Bury MBC website.

References

Parks and commons in the Metropolitan Borough of Bury
Country parks in Greater Manchester
Tourist attractions in the Metropolitan Borough of Bury
Bury, Greater Manchester